Marcello Mastroianni: I Remember is a 1997 Italian documentary film about the actor Marcello Mastroianni and directed by Anna Maria Tatò. It was screened in the Un Certain Regard section at the 1997 Cannes Film Festival.

Cast
 Marcello Mastroianni - Himself
 Renato Berta - Himself
 Manoel de Oliveira - Himself
 Diogo Dória - Himself
 Leonor Silveira - Herself

Release
Mastroianni's wife Flora Carabella as well as his former partner, Catherine Deneuve, and daughter, Chiara Mastroianni, tried to block the film from release. They were unsuccessful and the film went on to play at the 1997 Cannes Film Festival.

References

External links

1997 films
1997 documentary films
1990s Italian-language films
Italian documentary films
Films directed by Anna Maria Tatò
Documentary films about actors
1990s Italian films